Thamesville is a community in Chatham-Kent, Ontario, Canada.  It is located at the junction of former provincial Highways 2 and 21, between Chatham and London.  Its name comes from the Thames River that flows nearby and the suffix -"ville".  Post office established in 1832.

It has a very small downtown with several restaurants and stores, such as Thamesville Surplus, Home Hardware, The Lucky Kitchen, Johnny Quest, Thoroughly Painted Quarters Mennonite Furniture, Canterlope Western Apparel and Tack, and The Bee's Hive. Parks Blueberries is outside of town on highway 2. Students get bussed to Dresden for Secondary Education, at Lambton-Kent Composite School or other local secondary schools such as, Ursuline College Chatham, Chatham-kent composite school, and Ridgetown District high-school. Thamesville has one Public Elementary School (Thamesville Area Central School), and one Catholic Elementary School (Good Shepherd Catholic School).

It is the home of the Threshing Festival, which is held annually in the month of June. The Threshing Festival's main attraction is the midway and the large parade held on the first night of the Festival. The festival sticks to its "rural roots" by featuring such events as: Lawnmower races, Farmer Olympics, and Frog Jumping contests.

The former town hall (right) is now a public library and museum.

Near Thamesville is the site of a famous battle in the War of 1812. It is there that Shawnee leader Tecumseh was killed during the Battle of the Thames. In tribute to this war hero, a monument stands across from the field where the battle occurred.

Thamesville is also the birthplace of famous Canadian author Robertson Davies who wrote the Deptford Trilogy of novels (Fifth Business, The Manticore, and World of Wonders), in which Thamesville is fictionalized as the town of Deptford, Ontario.

Bulldog Steel Wool is manufactured in Thamesville.

Demographics 

Notable people
 Birthplace of author Robertson Davies

See also

 List of unincorporated communities in Ontario

References

External links
 Thamesville on Chatham-Kent Community Portal

Communities in Chatham-Kent
Designated places in Ontario